Cold Steel (Chinese:遍地狼烟) is a Chinese action film directed by David Wu. It was originally titled Bian di lang yan and was released in Hong Kong on December 2, 2011.

Cast
 Tony Leung Ka-Fai
 Peter Ho
 Song Jia
 Yu Rongguang
 Angeles Woo

References

External links
 

2011 action films
2011 films
Chinese action films